King Creosote Says "Buy The Bazouki Hair Oil" is the sixteenth studio album by King Creosote, released in 2001.

Track listing
Whine Glasses  
Conscience  
Sunny-Side Up  
Moral Tenderhooks  
Bubble  
It's Boredom Alright  
Fine  
Sunshine  
Crybaby  
You Want to Walk  
I'll Fly By the Seat of My Pants  
It's All Very Well Lester Flatt  
How Brave Am I?

2001 albums
King Creosote albums